Diego Brambilla (born 17 February 1969) is an Italian judoka. A member of the International Judo Federation, he competed in the men's lightweight event at the 1996 Summer Olympics. He also won the World Cups in 1993, (U71kg) bronze medal in 1995, and Prague in 1996.

References

External links
 

1969 births
Living people
Italian male judoka
Olympic judoka of Italy
Judoka at the 1996 Summer Olympics
Sportspeople from Monza
Mediterranean Games silver medalists for Italy
Mediterranean Games medalists in judo
Competitors at the 1993 Mediterranean Games
20th-century Italian people